Torodora granata is a moth in the family Lecithoceridae. It was described by Chun-Sheng Wu and You-Qiao Liu in 1994. It is found in China (Hainan) and Vietnam.

References

Moths described in 1994
Torodora